Gawain, also known in many other forms and spellings, is a character in Arthurian legend, in which he is King Arthur's nephew and a Knight of the Round Table. The prototype of Gawain is mentioned under the name Gwalchmei in the earliest Welsh sources. He has subsequently appeared in many Arthurian stories in Welsh, Latin, French, English, Scottish, Dutch, German, Spanish, and Italian, notably as the protagonist of the Middle English poem Sir Gawain and the Green Knight. Other tales featuring Gawain as the central character include De Ortu Waluuanii, Diu Crône, Ywain and Gawain, Golagros and Gawane, Sir Gawain and the Carle of Carlisle, L'âtre périlleux, La Mule sans frein, La Vengeance Raguidel, Le Chevalier à l'épée, The Awntyrs off Arthure, The Greene Knight, and The Weddynge of Syr Gawen and Dame Ragnell.

In Arthurian chivalric romance literature, Gawain is usually depicted as King Arthur's closest companion and an integral member of the elite Round Table. In the best-known versions of the legend, he is the son of Arthur's sister Morgause and King Lot of Orkney and Lothian. His younger brothers (or half-brothers) are Agravain, Gaheris, Gareth, and the infamous Mordred. However, his familial relations and upbringing are recorded differently in various accounts. They often involve Gawain unknowingly being raised in foster care in Rome before returning to Britain to reunite happily with his biological relatives. His many children from his numerous wives and lovers include the "Fair Unknown" Gingalain, himself a popular hero of Arthurian romance. 

In the early Welsh texts, Gawain is portrayed as a formidable but courteous and compassionate warrior, fiercely loyal to his king and his family. He is known as a friend to young knights, a defender of the poor and the unfortunate, and as the "Maidens' Knight", a rescuer of women as well—in more than one variant of the Castle of Maidens theme. Other notable recurring motifs include his learned healing skills, his special swords that may include the famed Caliburn (Excalibur), and his mighty warhorse named Gringolet. In the later version of his legend, he possesses superhuman strength connected to a day and night cycle, adding to his already outstanding martial prowess and making him an invincible swordsman around noon, when the sun is at its height.

However, Gawain's glowing portrayal diminishes in the Vulgate Cycle, which favours Lancelot and, especially, Galahad. His character turns markedly ignoble in the Post-Vulgate Cycle, and even outright villainous in the Prose Tristan, resulting in his conflicting characterization in Le Morte d'Arthur. While he was originally known for his religious piety, here he becomes a symbol of secular knighthood and thus a major object of criticism by the authors of French prose cycles. Two important plotlines shed light on Gawain's redefined characterization: his being a leader in the family blood feud against the clan of King Pellinore and his initially close friendship with another great knight, Sir Lancelot, which becomes a bitter rivalry when he seeks vengeance for the death of his brothers. In this tradition, featured in Le Morte d'Arthur, Gawain's sinful ways and his unforgiving nature inadvertently lead to the fall of Arthur and the Round Table, and ultimately his own death by Lancelot's hand.

Name

Gawain is known by different names and variants in different languages. The character corresponds to the Welsh Gwalchmei ap Gwyar (meaning "son of Gwyar"), or Gwalchmai, and thorough the Middle Ages was known in Latin as Galvaginus, Gualgunus (Gualguanus, Gualguinus), Gualgwinus, Walwanus (Walwanius), Waluanus, Walwen, etc.; in Old French  (and sometimes English) primarily as Gavain (Gavaine) and also as Gauvain (Gauvaine), Gauvan (Gauvayn), Gauven (Gauvein/Gauveyn), Gavan (Gavane) or
Gavayn (Gavayne); in Middle High German as Gâwein or Gâwân; in Italian dialects as Galvagin or Galvano; in Old Spanish as Galván; in Old Portuguese as Galvam or Galvão; and in Middle English also as Gawaine, Gawan (Gawane), Gawayn (Gawayne), Gawein (Gaweine), 
Gaweyn (Gaweyne), Gauwein (Gauweine), Gauweyn (Gauweyne) or Wawen (Wowen), among many other forms and spellings. The later forms are generally assumed to derive from the Welsh Gwalchmei.

The element Gwalch means hawk, and is a typical epithet in medieval Welsh poetry. The meaning of mei is uncertain. It has been suggested that it refers to the month of May (Mai in Modern Welsh), rendering "Hawk of May", although Rachel Bromwich considers this unlikely. Kenneth Jackson suggests the name evolved from an early Common Brittonic name *Ualcos Magesos, meaning "Hawk of the Plain". Not all scholars accept the gwalch derivation. John Koch suggests the name could be derived from a Brythonic original *Wolcos Magesos, "Wolf/Errant Warrior of the Plain." 

Others argue that the continental forms do not ultimately derive from Gwalchmei. Roger Sherman Loomis suggests a derivation from the epithet Gwallt Avwyn, found in the list of heroes in Culhwch and Olwen, which he translates as "hair like reins" or "bright hair". Lauran Toorians proposes that the Dutch name Walewein (attested in Flanders and France c. 1100) was earliest, suggesting it entered Britain during the large settlement of Flemings in Wales in the early 12th century. However, most scholarship supports a derivation from Gwalchmei, variants of which are well attested in Wales and Brittany. Bromwich, Joseph Loth, and Heinrich Zimmer all trace the etymology of the continental versions to a corruption of the Breton form of this name, Walcmoei.

Gwalchmei
Gawain's precursor, Gwalchmei son of Gwyar, was a hero of Welsh mythology and clearly a major figure of the now largely lost oral tradition. His popularity greatly increased after foreign versions, particularly those derived from Geoffrey of Monmouth's Historia Regum Britanniae, became known in Wales. The Gwyar (meaning "gore" or "spilled blood/bloodshed") in Gwalchmei ap Gwyar is likely the name of Gwalchmei's mother, rather than his father, as is the standard in the Welsh Triads. Gwyar appears as a daughter of Amlawdd Wledig in one version of the hagiographical genealogy Bonedd y Saint. The 14th-century fragment Birth of Arthur, a Welsh text that adapts scenes from Geoffrey, substitutes Gwyar for Anna, Geoffrey's name for Gawain's mother, the Queen of Orkney. His father is named as Emyr Llydaw (Emperor of Brittany), that is Budic II of Brittany. There, Gwalchmei is given three sisters: Gracia, Graeria, and Dioneta, the last of which being a counterpart of Morgan.

Early references to Gwalchmei include the Welsh Triads; the Englynion y Beddau (Stanzas of the Graves), which lists the site of his grave; the Trioedd y Meirch (Triads of the Horses), which praises his horse named Keincaled (known as Gringolet in the works of medieval French authors); and Cynddelw's elegy for Owain Gwynedd, which compares Owain's boldness to that of Gwalchmei. In the Welsh Triads, Triad 4 lists him as one of the "Three Well-Endowed Men of the Isle of Britain" (probably referring to his inheritance); Triad 75 describes him as one of the "Three Men of the Island of Britain who were Most Courteous to Guests and Strangers"; and Triad 91 praises his fearlessness. Some versions of Triads 42 and 46 also praise his horse Keincaled, echoing the Triads of the Horses. The singling out of Gwalchmei as Most Courteous evokes his role in the Mabinogion, where he regularly serves as an intermediary between  King Arthur's court and stranger knights.

An early Welsh romance Culhwch and Olwen, composed in the 11th century (though not recorded until the 14th), and eventually associated with the Mabinogion, ascribes to Gwalchmei the same relationship with Arthur that Gawain is later given: he is the son of Arthur's sister and one of his leading warriors. However, he is mentioned only twice in the text, once in the extensive list of Arthur's court towards the beginning of the story, and again as one of the "Six Helpers" whom Arthur sends with the protagonist Culhwch on his journey to find his love Olwen. Unlike the other helpers, he takes no further part in the action. This suggests he was added to the romance later, likely under the influence of the Welsh versions of Geoffrey's Historia. He also appears in Peredur fab Efrawg (Peredur son of Efrawg), part of the Mabinogion, where he aids the hero Peredur in the final battle against the nine witches of Caer Loyw. A similar motif was mentioned by the 16th-century Welsh scholar Sion Dafydd Rhys in an unrecorded oral tale in which Gwalchmei destroyed three evil witch-sisters, wives of the giants previously slain by Arthur, killing them within their castles through his cunning, as they could not be defeated otherwise, due to their powers. Gwalchmei himself appears as a giant in Welsh folklore.

Gawain

Histories and romances

The first known references to Gawain outside Wales began to appear in the first half of the 12th century. For instance, William of Malmesbury writes, in his Gesta Regum Anglorum of around 1125, that "Walwen's" grave had been uncovered in Pembrokeshire hundreds of years after his death, following the 11th-century Norman conquest of England. William recounts how Arthur's nephew, a renowned Post-Roman Briton soldier celebrated for his bravery, tirelessly fought against the Saxons led by Hengest's brother: "He deservedly shared in his uncle's praising, because he prevented the fall of his collapsing country for many years." William also noted uncertainty regarding the manner of his death: "There, as certain people claim, he [Walwen] was wounded by his enemies, and cast forth from a shipwreck; by others, it is said that he was killed by his fellow citizens at a public feast. Therefore, knowledge of the truth falls in doubt, although neither of these stories would fail in defense of his fame." He also describes Walwen as a former ruler of Galloway, which he says was still called Walweitha centuries later in his times.

However, it was Geoffrey of Monmouth's version of Gawain in the Historia Regum Britanniae, written around 1136, that brought the character to a wider audience. As in the Welsh tradition, Geoffrey's Gawain (Gualguanus) is the son of Arthur's sister, here named Anna, and her husband is Lot (Loth), the prince of Lothian and one of Arthur's key supporters. Geoffrey mentions that Gawain was twelve years old at the time when King Lot and Arthur began a war with Norway, and that he had previously served Pope Sulpicius in Rome. Gawain later plays a major role as one of the leaders in Arthur's victorious war against the Romans, having personally started this great conflict by killing the Roman envoy Caius (Gaius Quintilianus) who had insulted him and Arthur. Geoffrey's Gawain is depicted as a supreme warrior (even calling him and Hoel the two "warriors than whom no better had ever been born") and potential heir to the throne until he is tragically struck down by the forces of his traitorous brother Mordred (Modredus) at Richborough, during an attempted sea landing that turned into a disaster.

Geoffrey's work was immensely popular and was adapted into many languages. The Norman version by Wace, the Roman de Brut, ascribes to Gawain the chivalric aspect he would take in later literature, wherein he favours courtliness and love over martial valor. Several later works expand on Geoffrey's mention of Gawain's boyhood spent in Rome, the most important of which is the anonymous Medieval Latin De Ortu Waluuanii Nepotis Arturi (The Rise of Gawain, Nephew of Arthur), which describes his birth, boyhood, and early adventures leading up to his knighting by his uncle.

Beginning with the five works of Chrétien de Troyes in the second half of the 12th century, Gawain became a very popular figure in Old French chivalric romances. Chrétien features Gawain as a major character and establishes some characteristics that pervade later depictions, including his unparalleled courteousness and his way with women. His romances set the pattern often followed in later works in which Gawain serves as an ally to the protagonist and a model of knighthood to whom others are compared. However, in Chrétien's later romances, especially Lancelot, le Chevalier de la Charrette (Lancelot, the Knight of the Cart) and Perceval ou le Conte du Graal (Perceval, the Story of the Grail), the eponymous heroes Lancelot and Percival prove morally superior to Gawain, who follows the rules of courtliness to the letter rather than the spirit. Chrétien's story of Gawain's cousin Yvain, Yvain ou le Chevalier au Lion (Yvain, the Knight of the Lion), was translated into Middle English as Ywain and Gawain. Gawain is also prominent in the continuations of Perceval, in particular the First Continuation and Perlesvaus.

An influx of romances written in French appeared in Chrétien's wake. While Gawain stands out as the most popular character of all Arthurian knights in the entire genre, their authors characterise him variously. In some of these "Gawain romances", such as La Vengeance Raguidel (or Messire Gauvain) and La Mule sans frein (perhaps also written by Chrétien himself), he is the hero. Sometimes he is also the subject of burlesque humor, as in the parody Le Chevalier à l'épée (The Knight with the Sword). In the variants of the Bel Inconnu (Fair Unknown) story, he is the father of the hero. , also known as Le Chevalier aux deux épées (The Knight of Two Swords), contrasts the adventures of Gawain with these of the eponymous Mériadeuc, his former squire.

For the English and the Scottish, Gawain remained a respectable and heroic figure, becoming the subject of several romances (a dozen in English, besides the likes of the Anglo-Norman Romanz du reis Yder) and lyrics in the dialects of their nations, such as the Middle Scots poem Golagros and Gawane. Important Gawain romances in English include The Awntyrs off Arthure (The Adventures of Arthur), Syre Gawene and the Carle of Carlyle (Sir Gawain and the Carle of Carlisle), and The Avowyng of Arthur (The Avowing of Arthur). The Middle High German romance Diu Crône (The Crown) by Heinrich von dem Türlin, in which Gawain is the protagonist who achieves the Grail and heals the Fisher King, also features a minor character of "the other Gawain": his lookalike, Aamanz. 

Gawain is notably the hero of one of the greatest works of Middle English literature, the alliterative poem Sir Gawain and the Green Knight, where he is portrayed as an excellent, but human, knight. Here, Gawain strongly resembles the Irish mythological hero Cuchulainn. In the poem, he must go to the titular Green Knight to, presumably, be killed by the Knight. Gawain does this as it pertains to a deal made between the two without knowing that it is all a test by the Knight. He is cited in Robert Laneham's letter describing the entertainments at Kenilworth in 1575, and the recopying of earlier works such as The Greene Knight suggests that a popular English tradition of Gawain continued. Different variants of the Green Knight story include The Turke and Sir Gawain. In possibly Thomas Malory's The Weddynge of Syr Gawen and Dame Ragnell (The Wedding of Sir Gawain and Dame Ragnelle), his wits, virtue, and respect for women frees his wife, a loathly lady, from her curse of ugliness. The Child Ballads include a preserved legend in a positive light: The Marriage of Sir Gawain, a fragmentary version of the story of The Wedding of Sir Gawain and Dame Ragnelle.

The Lancelot-Grail (Vulgate Cycle) depicts Gawain as a proud and worldly knight and the leader of his siblings, who demonstrates through his failures the danger of neglecting the spiritual in favor of the material world. On the grand Grail Quest, his intentions are always the purest, but he is unable to use God's grace to see the error of his ways. Later, when his brothers  Mordred and Agravain plot to destroy Lancelot and Queen Guinevere by exposing their love affair, Gawain tries to stop them. When Guinevere is sentenced to burn at the stake and Arthur deploys his best knights to guard the execution, Gawain nobly refuses to take part in the deed, even though his brothers will be there. But when Lancelot returns to rescue Guinevere, a battle between Lancelot's and Arthur's knights ensues, and Gawain's brothers Gareth and Gaheris are killed (Agravain, too, is killed by Lancelot, either on this occasion or in a previous encounter). This turns his friendship with Lancelot into hatred, and his desire for vengeance causes him to draw Arthur into a war with Lancelot in France. In the king's absence, Mordred usurps the throne, and the Britons must return to save Britain. Meanwhile, Gawain is mortally wounded by Lancelot himself after a long duel. The Vulgate Mort Artu has Gawain's dead body carried to Camelot, where he is placed in the tomb of his dear brother Gaheriet (Gaheris).

Gawain's death in a battle against Mordred is described in detail in the English Alliterative Morte Arthure. Upon reaching land after returning to Britain from the continent, Gawain wreaks great slaughter on his enemies, killing the king of Gothland among others, before being surrounded on a hill. Breaking out, he pushes forward on a horse towards Mordred himself, and the two strike one another down from their horses with their lances. Gawain then attempts to cut Mordred's throat, but Mordred stabs him through the helmet. (As Mordred is portrayed there more sympathetically than in most other works, he later gives a sorrowful eulogy to his dead brother, calling him the best and most glorious of knights.) In the Italian romance La Tavola Ritonda, having been defeated in his duel with Lancelot, Gawain takes part in resisting an attack by Lancelot's friend and ally, Sir Turinoro of Cartagina, when he is struck on his head in the same place where Lancelot had wounded him and falls dead during a single combat with a knight named Turinoro, who also dies.

Thomas Malory's English compilation work Le Morte d'Arthur is based mainly, but not exclusively, on French works from the Vulgate and Post-Vulgate Cycles. Here Gawain partly retains the negative characteristics attributed to him by the later French authors, and partly retains his earlier positive representations, creating a character seen by some as inconsistent, and by others as a believably flawed hero. Gawain is the first to declare that he "shall laboure in the Queste of the Sankgreall" but really embarks on the Grail quest in order to gain more magical meals and drinks (metys and drynkes) from it rather than from a religious zeal or to save the Fisher King's kingdom. One of Malory's other French sources was L'âtre périlleux (The Perilous Cemetery), a poem about Gawain's rescue of a woman from a demon.

Malory's version of Gawain's demise follows the Vulgate. Gawain's two sons and his brothers, except for Mordred, end up slain by Lancelot and his followers. Their death unleashes the vindictive hostility of Gawain towards his former friend, drawing Arthur himself into a war with Lancelot, first in Britain and then in France. Gawain's rage is so great that he refuses to cease fighting even after the Pope steps in and issues a bull to end the violence between Arthur's and Lancelot's factions. Following Mordred's betrayal, Gawain wages two wars against both Mordred and Lancelot. He twice challenges Lancelot to a duel, but each time loses and asks Lancelot to kill him. Lancelot refuses and grants him mercy before leaving. The mortally injured Gawain later writes to Lancelot, repenting of his bitterness, asking for his help against Mordred, and for forgiveness for splitting the Round Table. Following his death, Gawain also appears in Arthur's dream vision to tell him to wait thirty days for the reconciled Lancelot to return to Britain before fighting Mordred. Consequently, Arthur sends Lucan and Bedivere to make a temporary peace treaty, but the bloody final conflict ensues anyway. Upon his eventual arrival, Lancelot weeps at Gawain's tomb for two nights. In his editorial preface to Malory's Le Morte d'Arthur, William Caxton wrote that those visiting Dover Castle can still "see the skull of [Sir Gawaine], and the same wound is seen that Sir Launcelot gave him in battle."

Finally, there are versions in which Gawain does not die. In Jean des Preis's Belgian Ly Myreur des Histors, Arthur, defeated and wounded in his last battle with Mordrech (Mordred), goes with Gawain in a boat to the magic isle of Avalon for them to be healed there by the king's sister Morgaine (Morgan). The surviving Gawain also features in the earlier French epic poem , appearing together with Arthur and Morgan in Avalon, where they are all still alive hundreds of years later.

Origin narratives and alternate siblings 
Les Enfances Gauvain, based in part on De Ortu Waluuanii, tells of how Arthur's sister Morcades (Morgause) becomes pregnant by Lot, at this point a mere page in King Arthur's court. She and Lot secretly give the child to a knight named Gawain the Brown (Gauvain li Brun) who baptises the infant with his own name, puts the infant Gawain in a cask with a letter explaining who the child is, and sets him adrift on the sea. The cask is found by a fisherman and his wife. Sometime after Gawain is ten years of age, his foster-father vows to make a pilgrimage to Rome if he recovers from his severe illness. When he undertakes the pilgrimage, he takes his foster-child with him to Rome. There a clerk reads the knight's letter, understands that the boy is of high birth, and the Pope takes Gawain as his own foster-son. Accounts similar to this can be found in Perlesvaus, the Gesta Romanorum, and many other texts.

In De Ortu Waluuani, the young Gawain, trained as a Roman cavalry officer, undertakes a duel to determine whether Rome or Persia should possess Jerusalem. On his way, Gawain and his men defeat the pirate king Milocrates and his brother Buzafarnam, rescuing the Roman Emperor's niece whom Milocrates has abducted. In Jerusalem, he fights the giant Persian champion Gormund and slays him after three days of single combat. He is then sent to King Arthur with the proof of his birth. Arthur's queen, here named Gwendoloena and possessing prophetic powers, warns Arthur of the coming of a knight of Rome who is more powerful than him; Arthur and Kay meet Gawain on his way but he unhorses them both. Gawain then arrives at Arthur's court, but the king rejects him despite learning of the knight being his nephew. In response, Gawain vows that he will do what Arthur's entire army could not do. The occasion comes when the Lady of the Castle of Maidens sends to Arthur for aid, having been abducted by a pagan king who wants to force marriage on her. Arthur and his forces go to fight the pagan army but lose, yet Gawain single-handedly succeeds and returns with the Lady and with the pagan king's head. Arthur is finally forced to publicly accept the knight's worth, and Lot and Anna formally acknowledge Gawain as their son.

[[File:Caen église St Pierre Gauvain.JPG|thumb|left|Parzival'''s Gawain in a capital relief at the Church of Saint-Pierre, Caen]]

Similar to this tale are the stories of the Castle of Wonders, found in Diu Crône, Chrétien's Perceval, Wolfram von Eschenbach's Parzival, and the Norse Valvens þáttr (The Tale of Gawain), wherein Gawain comes to the castle where, unknown to him, live his grandmother (King Arthur's mother), his own mother, and his sister. Gawain becomes the castle's lord, and it would be likely that he would unknowingly marry either his mother or his sister, but Gawain discovers who the women are. In a variant included in the Gesta Romanorum, a Gawain-like character named Gregory comes to a castle where his mother dwells, besieged by the Duke of Burgundy. Gregory enters the lady's service and succeeds in winning back her lands, after which he unwittingly marries his own mother.

Later romances, however, abandon the motif of Gawain being brought up, unknown, in Rome. In the Suite du Merlin attributed to Robert de Boron, a marriage between King Lot and a daughter of Ygerne (Igraine, Arthur's mother) is part of the negotiations arranging for Arthur's father Uther Pendragon's marriage to Ygerne; Gawain must be thus about the same age as Arthur, or even older. In the Vulgate Merlin, he first appears as a young squire in his father's kingdom. Gawain, his brother Gaheris, and a number of other squires, most of them sons or kindred of the kings who at this time are rebelling against King Arthur, come together and defend the land of Logres against the Saxons while Arthur is away aiding King Leodegan (Leodegrance) against King Rion (Rience), after which Arthur knights the squires. During this time, Gawain notably saves their mother Belisent (Morgause) and the infant Mordred from being kidnapped by the Saxon king Taurus. This account is revised in the later Post-Vulgate Merlin, where King Lot fights against Arthur but his forces are defeated and he himself is killed by King Pellinor (Pellinore), one of King Arthur's allies. Gawain first appears as an eleven-year-old boy at Lot's funeral and swears to avenge his father's death on Pellinor, praying that he may never be known for knightly deeds until he has taken vengeance. The story of the feud between Gawain and Pellinor and his sons is very important in the Post-Vulgate Cycle and the Prose Tristan, but not a trace of it is found in the Lancelot-Grail Cycle or in any earlier known tale, some of which picture Lot as still alive long after Gawain becomes a knight.

In many works outside the Lancelot-Grail-derived tradition in which Gawain has only his now-familiar four brothers (among whom he is the eldest and is explicitly described as the most handsome of them by the Vulgate Lancelot), Gawain also has sisters in different settings. These include an unnamed sister whom he rescues (along with her unnamed husband and children) from a giant in Chrétien's Yvain; two sisters named Soredamors (Cligés' mother) and Clarissant in Chrétien's Cligés; an unnamed sister abducted by Gorvain Cadru in Hunbaut; and Elainne in the Modena manuscript of the Didot Perceval. In Parzival, he has two sisters named Cundriê and Itonjê and a sole younger brother named Beacurs (the King of Norway and a Knight of the Round Table who marries King Bagdemagus's niece Antonie). In some Welsh adaptations of Historia Regum Britanniae and in The Birth of Arthur, King Hoel is his half-brother from their mother's first marriage. Mordred is Gawain's younger brother (by Lot, originally) or half-brother (by Arthur, later) in almost every text in which he figures since Geoffrey of Monmouth.

Attributes and characterizations

Traditionally, Gawain, of all Arthur's knights, is known for his courteousness, compassion, and humility. In Gawain: His Reputation, His Courtesy and His Appearance in Chaucer's Squire's Tale, B.J. Whiting collected quantitative evidence of these qualities being stronger in Gawain than in any of the other Knights of the Round Table, counting the words "courteous", "courtesy", and "courteously" being used in reference to Arthur's nephew as 178 times in total, more than for all the other knights in Arthurian literature. The Prose Lancelot describes Gawain as the most handsome of his brothers and notably gracious towards poor people and to societal outcasts such as lepers; the one time when he fails to properly greet an unknown maiden (Viviane) while on a quest to learn the fate of Merlin in the Vulgate Merlin Continuation, she curses him with a spell that turns him into a hideous dwarf, but later restores him to his real form after he passes a test to save her from an apparent rape in an arranged "damsel in distress"-style scenario. In some versions of the legend, Gawain would have been the true and rightful heir to the throne of Camelot, after the reign of King Arthur.Hall, p. 3.

The Vulgate Mort Artu says Gawain had been baptised as an infant by a miracle-working holy man, also named Gawain, who named the boy after himself, and who announced the following day that every day at noon, at the hour of the baptism, his power and strength would increase. The Post-Vulgate tells how, in great part due to his supernatural strength, there have been only six knights whom Gawain failed to defeat in a sword fight: Lancelot,  Hector, Bors, his own brother Gaheris (replaced with Percival by Malory), Tristan, and Morholt. In Perceval and some other later stories, he is the other wielder of Arthur's magic sword Excalibur; in the Alliterative Morte Arthure, he has a sword named Galuth, which bears the name Galatine in Malory's version of the Roman War episode. His knowledge of herbs also makes him a great healer, as shown in Chrétien's Perceval, Valvens Þáttr, Parzival, Walewein, and the Dutch Lancelot Compilation (in the stories Moriaen, Die Riddere metter Morwen, Walewein ende Keye, and Lancelot en het Hert met de Witte Voet).

In many romances, Gawain is depicted as a model for chivalric attributes. In Sir Gawain and the Green Knight, for example, where he is described as "this fine father of breeding", Gawain receives the kisses of Lady Bertilak with discretion, at once not wanting to insult her by refusing her advances and not wanting to betray the hospitality of her husband. Based on the bargain to give each other their respective daily gains, Gawain must give the kisses he receives from Lady Bertilak to Sir Bertilak. This allusion serves to reinforce chivalric ideals of religious, martial, and courtly love codes, especially in a masculine warrior culture, and shows the ways in which the masculine world can be subverted by female wiles. This undertone of homoeroticism between Gawain and Sir Bertilak underscores the strength of male homosocial bonds, and the fact that sex never occurs reinforces ideals of the masculine chivalric code. Gawain's character in the poem is said to be founded on a deep Christian belief in Christ and the Virgin Mary.

Conversely, in the Vulgate Queste del Saint Graal he is used as a very symbol of the unfitness of secular knighthood. Here, Gawain is blamed for his irreligion and is shown to indulge in rather purposeless killing: as, for example, when he mortally wounds his relative and a fellow Knight of the Round Table, Yvain the Bastard, in one of the many random jousting duels for no particular reason (failing to even recognise him until it is too late). He is also responsible for the deaths of more of his fellow Round Table companions, including the young King Bagdemagus of Gorre, whom he accidentally kills during a tournament. The Vulgate Mort Artu even says Gawain had killed some of his fellow Knights of the Round Table in the grand quest for the Grail, which he turned out to be unworthy to achieve. When Gawain does reach the Grail Castle, he is unable to restore the Grail Sword, unlike his role in Perceval, and is actually more interested in the Grail Maiden than in the holy relic, failing to even spot it there. In a symbolic later scene, it is her son and the new destined Grail hero, the blessed virgin knight Galahad, who will draw the sword in the stone at Camelot, after Gawain failed in the task. In the end, Gawain's unwillingness to forgive Lancelot leads to his own death and contributes to the downfall of Arthur's kingdom.

In the Post-Vulgate Cycle, Gawain's character is further blackened, influenced by being portrayed as a villain in the Prose Tristan. He is now bloodthirsty and often murderous. Among important Knights of the Round Table whom Gawain is said to have killed during and after the Grail quest are King Pellinor's son Aglovale, King Lac's son Erec, and King Esclabor's son Palamedes (resulting in Escablor's own death from grief). Earlier, Gawain and his brothers are also the slayers of King Pellinor and his sons Driant and Lamorat. Although Gawain still has a reputation for being one of the best and most courteous knights in the world, this is a sham, as he is often secretly a rapist of damsels and a killer of good knights, no better than his brother Agravain. When the mighty and holy Grail knight Perceval asks Gawain if he had killed his father Pellinor, Gawain simply lies and denies it out of fear of Perceval. The Guiron le Courtois section of Palamedes explains Gawain's many great cruelties being caused by his grief at being surpassed by other knights after not regaining his full strength following the war with Galehaut. Such a new popular image originating in the late Old French romance tradition prompted the historical audience of The Wife of Bath's Tale to identify the story's rapist-knight character as Gawain.

Malory's Gawain, following the later French portrayals, also "emerges as a character composed of obvious inconsistencies of virtue and evil." According to Arthurian scholar Ryan Harper, 

Children and relationships

Hartmann von Aue's Erec is the first to mention Gawain's offspring, listing one "Henec the Skillful, son of Gawain" (Henec suctellois fil Gawin), among the Knights of the Round Table. Thomas Malory credits Gawain with three sons through the Lady of Lys, a sister of Bran de Lys/Lis (or "Brandles" in the Middle English The Jeaste of Syr Gawayne); they are named Florence, Lovell, and Gingalain. Both Lovell (Lioniel) and Gingalain (Guinglain) have previously appeared in the First Continuation to Chrétien's Perceval and in the Livre d'Artus. Gingalain is the only of them to play a significant role in further works, as the eponymous protagonist of Renaud de Beaujeu's Old French romance Le Bel Inconnu (The Fair Unknown), as well as of the Middle-English romance Libeaus Desconus and of its Middle High German version Wigalois (titled after Gingalain's name) by Wirnt von Grafenberg. Besides those children, the eponymous hero of Beaudous by Robert de Blois is the son of Gawain by the king of Wales's unnamed daughter, who is known only as the Lover (Amie). She might be the same as the also unnamed daughter of King Tradelmant of North Wales, a hitherto virgin who becomes pregnant by Gawain out of wedlock in the Prose Lancelot.

Since Gawain is known in multiple tales as the "Knight of Maidens" (French: Chevalier as Damoisels), his name is thus attached to no woman in particular. As such, he is the champion of all women, and through this reputation, he has avoided the name-pairing seen in tales of Erec (with Enide), Tristan (with Iseult), and Lancelot (with Guinevere). Nevertheless, Gawain has had wives in the course of Arthurian literature, albeit he is always introduced as yet unmarried at the beginning of any such story. In The Wedding of Sir Gawain and Dame Ragnelle, he marries the cursed Ragnelle, and in giving her "sovereignty" in the relationship, lifts the spell laid upon her that had given her a hag-like appearance. In Parzival, Gawain marries Orguelleuse, the widow of the Duke of Logres. (In Perlesvaus, the mad Orguelleuse instead unsuccessfully plots to kill Gawain and then to entomb herself with him; she is called the Maiden of the Narrow Wood in Hunbaut.) In Mériadeuc, the Queen of the Isles swears she will marry only Gawain. In Diu Crône, Gawain marries Amurfina, a niece of Arthur's stepfather (here named Gansguoter) who wins Gawain from her own younger sister Sgoidamur through the use of a magic bridle and a love potion.

Repeatedly, Gawain is also often intimately associated with a supernatural female figure from the Otherworld or the Fairyland. The mother of Gawain's son in Wigalois is known as Florie, likely another version of Lorie from Rigomer; she also appears as Floree, daughter of King Alain of Escavalon, in the Livre d'Artus. The Italian romance La Pulzella Gaia has Gawain fight and defeat a giant serpent that turns out to be just a form of fairy princess, the daughter of Morgan le Fay (Fata Morgana) who then becomes his secret lover; their relationship, once revealed, makes both of them into enemies of Guinevere (who is jealous of Gawain after having been spurned), Arthur, and Morgan all at once.

Other women of Gawain include Lady Bloisine who plots to murder Gawain in bed before genuinely falling in love with him in the Fourth Continuation of Perceval, Ydain (Ydeine) who pledges to love him for life after he rescues her in La Vengeance Raguidel and the Roman van Lancelot, and the haughty and cruel Arcade who loves Gawain but he gives her up to the young Pelleas after helping him win her over in the Prose Lancelot. Arcade is renamed as Lady Ettarde in Malory's version with no happy end for her; his Le Morte d'Arthur also mentions Gawain having once been in the power of the lustful witch Hellawes. In the Prose Lancelot, Gawain also expressed his desire to himself become the most beautiful lady so he could be loved by the mysterious Black Knight (Lancelot appearing incognito). 

Modern portrayals

Gawain features frequently in modern literature and media. Modern depictions of him are often heavily influenced by Malory, though characterizations are inconsistent. Alfred Tennyson adapted episodes from Malory to present Gawain as a worldly and faithless knight in his Idylls of the King (1859-1885). Similarly, T. H. White's novel The Once and Future King (1958) follows Malory, but presents Gawain as more churlish than Malory's torn and tragic portrayal. In contrast, Thomas Berger's Arthur Rex (1978) portrays Gawain as open-minded and introspective about his flaws, qualities that make him the Round Table's greatest knight. Though he usually plays a supporting role, some works feature Gawain as the main character. Vera Chapman's The Green Knight (1975) and Anne Crompton's Gawain and Lady Green (1997) offer modern retellings of Sir Gawain and the Green Knight. Gwalchmei is the protagonist in Gillian Bradshaw's Celtic-tinged Hawk of May (1980) and its sequels. Gawain is a major character in The Squire's Tales series by Gerald Morris, in which he is portrayed as a skilled knight, immensely loyal to Arthur, and as intelligent, kind-hearted, and occasionally sarcastic. Morris included many legends involving Gawain in the second book, The Squire, His Knight, and His Lady (1999), drawing in particular from Sir Gawain and the Green Knight. An aged Gawain is one of the central characters in Kazuo Ishiguro's novel The Buried Giant (2015). In the manga Four Knights of the Apocalypse (2022), a sequel to Seven Deadly Sins, Gawain is a member of the eponymous Knights, portrayed as female, a hugely muscular and prideful niece of Arthur.

Film portrayals of Gawain, and the Arthurian legend in general, are often heavily indebted to Malory; White's The Once and Future King also exerts a heavy influence. Gawain appears as a supporting character in films such as Knights of the Round Table (1953, played by Robert Urquhart) and Excalibur (1981, played by Liam Neeson), all of which draw on elements of Gawain's traditional characterizations. Other films give Gawain a larger role. In the 1954 adaptation of Prince Valiant, he is a somewhat boorish, though noble and good-natured, foil for his squire and friend, Valiant. He plays his traditional part in the 1963 film Sword of Lancelot (played by George Baker), seeking revenge when Lancelot kills his unarmed brother Gareth, but ultimately coming to Lancelot's aid when he uncovers Mordred's responsibility. Sir Gawain and the Green Knight has been adapted to film several times, including 1973's Gawain and the Green Knight (played by Murray Head) and 1984's Sword of the Valiant (played by Miles O'Keeffe), both directed by Stephen Weeks; neither film was well reviewed and both deviate substantially from the source material. A 1991 television adaptation by Thames Television, Gawain and the Green Knight, was both more faithful and better received. Gawain's more recent film and television portrayals include the roles of Robert Gwyn Davin in First Knight (1995), Anthony Hickox in Prince Valiant (1997), Sebastian Roché in Merlin (1998), Noah Huntley in The Mists of Avalon (2001), Joel Edgerton in King Arthur (2004), Eoin Macken in Merlin (2008), Clive Standen in Camelot (2011), Matt Stokoe in Cursed (2020), and Takahiro Mizushima in  Fate/Extra Last Encore (2020). Another Sir Gawain and the Green Knight film adaptation starred Dev Patel as Gawain in The Green Knight (2021).

The character has appeared in a number of stage productions and operas, mostly interpretations of Sir Gawain and the Green Knight. Particularly notable among them is the 1991 opera Gawain, with music by Harrison Birtwistle and a libretto by David Harsent. Gawain furthermore appeared in a number of video games, including as the protagonist of Chronicles of the Sword (1997).

See also
 King Arthur's family

References
Citations

Bibliography
 Barber, Richard W. (1986). "The English Poems“. King Arthur Hero and Legend. New York: St. Martin's. .
 
 Bromwich, Rachel (2006). Trioedd Ynys Prydein: The Triads of the Island of Britain. University of Wales Press. .
 
 
 Hall, Louis B., ed. (1976), Knightly Tales of Sir Gawain. Chicago: Nelson Hall. .
 Kennedy,  Edward D. (2007).  "Gawain's Family and Friends." People and Texts. Relationships in Medieval Literature. Eds. Thea Summerfield and Keith Busby. Amsterdam: Rodopi.
 Koch, John T. (1995). "The Celtic Lands." In N. J. Lacy (ed.), Medieval Arthurian Literature: A Guide to Recent Research, pp. 239–322. New York.
 
 Lupack, Alan (2005). "Gawain." Oxford Guide to Arthurian Literature and Legend. Oxford: Oxford University Press. 291–327.
 
 Pughe, William Owen (1832). A Dictionary of the Welsh Language, Explained in English. London. Online.
 Rhys, John (2004 [1901]). Studies in the Arthurian Legend. Kessinger Publishing. .
 
 Weston, Jessie L. (1972). The Legend of Sir Gawain: Studies Upon its Original Scope and Significance. New York: AMS.
 Whiting, B. J. "Gawain: His Reputation, His Courtesy and His appearance in Chaucer's Squire's Tale." Mediaeval Studies'' 9 (1947): 189–234.

External links

Arthurian characters
Christmas characters
Fictional murderers
Fictional princes
Fictional rapists
Holy Grail
Knights of the Round Table
Mythological princes
Mythological swordfighters
Prince Valiant
King Arthur's family